The St. Anne's Church is the name given to a Catholic church on the island of Réunion, French overseas department in the Indian Ocean.

Located in the jurisdiction of the city of Saint-Benoît (St. Benedict) and the Roman Catholic Diocese of Saint-Denis de La Réunion, the church is the most notable building in the district of St. Anne (hence its classification as a historical monument). It previously served as the backdrop of François Truffaut's film "La sirène du Mississippi". This church is under special protection due to its classification as a historical monument since October 11, 1982.

See also
Roman Catholicism in Réunion
Church of St. Ann

References

Roman Catholic churches in Réunion